Bowen Creek is a stream in Phelps, Crawford and Gasconade counties in the U.S. state of Missouri. It is a tributary of Bourbeuse River.

The confluence is 1.5 mile west of Jake Prairie and two miles southeast of Redbird.

Bowen Creek has the name of Colonel Isaiah Bowen, the proprietor of a local watermill.

References

Rivers of Crawford County, Missouri
Rivers of Gasconade County, Missouri
Rivers of Phelps County, Missouri
Rivers of Missouri